The curling event at the 1924 Winter Olympics was contested only by men. It was the first curling event in Olympic history.

In February 2006, a few days before the start of the 2006 Winter Olympics, the International Olympic Committee ruled that the curling medals were part of the official Olympic programme in 1924, and not a demonstration event as many authoritative sources had previously claimed (although the IOC itself had never done so). This official confirmation was the culmination of an investigative campaign begun by the Glasgow-based newspaper The Herald, on behalf of the families of the eight British contestants who won the first curling gold medals. The winning team had been selected by the Royal Caledonian Curling Club, Perth.

Medals

Note: R. Cousin of Great Britain is listed in the Official Report as a "Non-Participant" and it is not known if he received a medal; however, Skip William Jackson of Great Britain is also listed in the Official Report as a "Non-Participant"

Round robin results
France, Great Britain and Sweden were the only countries to
participate in the curling competition, although a full Swiss team is listed as attending as "a Non-Participating team".

All games were 18 ends in length.

Standings

Draw 1
Monday 28 January 1924; 10:00 am

Draw 2
Tuesday 29 January 1924; 10:00 am

Draw 3
Wednesday 30 January 1924; 10:00 am

References

External links
The Herald - "Scotland Wins an Olympic Gold... 82 Years Later"
"The Herald sweeps Britain to curling gold medal"
BBC Sport - GB curlers awarded belated gold
1924 Olympic Curling Medals Count: CBC News Feb 8, 2006
Results copied from Official Report
Query for Medalists from the Official Site
Sports Reference record of curling in the 1924 Games
Team UK press release from 2006
The Winter Olympics: An Insider's Guide to the Legends, Lore and The Games by Ron C. Judd
Curling, Etcetera: A Whole Bunch of Stuff About the Roaring Game by Bob Weeks
The Curling History Blog - Debunking the story that a GB curler also played for Sweden at the 1924 Winter Olympics

 
1924 Winter Olympics events
1924
1924 in curling
Curling competitions in France